The 1953–54 La Salle Explorers men's basketball team represented La Salle University in the 1953–54 NCAA men's basketball season.  The team's head coach was Ken Loeffler.  La Salle won the 1954 NCAA basketball tournament.

Season summary
Some basketball historians have called La Salle star Tom Gola the Magic Johnson of his day because, at 6-7, he could play all five positions. But not even Magic piled up the kind of numbers Gola did in leading the Explorers to the 1954 national championship - 21.7 points and 23 rebounds per game. Guard Frank O’Hara was Gola’s capable running mate along with five sophomores who played complementary roles.

Sophomore Robert Ames, later a CIA official killed in the 1983 bombing of the United States embassy in Beirut, Lebanon, averaged two points and one rebound in 14 games for the Explorers.

NCAA tournament
West
 La Salle 76, Fordham 74
 La Salle 88, North Carolina State 81
 La Salle 64, Navy 48
Final Four
 La Salle 69, Pennsylvania State 54
 La Salle 92, Bradley 76

Rankings

Awards and honors
 Tom Gola, NCAA Men's MOP Award

Team players drafted into the NBA

References

La Salle Explorers men's basketball seasons
La Salle Explorers
NCAA Division I men's basketball tournament championship seasons
NCAA Division I men's basketball tournament Final Four seasons
La Salle
La Salle Explorers men's basketball
La Salle Explorers men's basketball